Breathe is an album by Keller Williams with the String Cheese Incident (collectively known as the Keller Williams Incident), released in 1999.

Critical reception
AllMusic wrote that "the accompaniment of the String Cheese Incident provides a wondrous canvas that elevates the richness of [Keller's] guitar work and frees him from the confines of looping." The Washington Post called the album "strange and delightfully odd," writing that "Williams weaves a lot of quirky textures and riffs into his original compositions, borrowing freely from funk, reggae, folk, pop and jazz to create a series of colorful backdrops for his curious musings ('Best Feelings'), entertaining rants ('Stupid Questions') and offbeat tales ('Vacate')."

Track listing 
 Stupid Questions – 4:55
 Brunette – 2:49
 Breathe – 4:11
 Best Feeling – 5:55
 Bounty Hunter – 3:25
 Vacate – 4:48
 Roshambo – 3:06
 Revelation – 5:10
 Lightning – 4:18
 Blatant Ripoff – 4:38
 Not Of This Earth – 5:07
 Rockumal – 3:21
 Callalloo And Red Snapper – 9:37 *

 includes hidden track – [unknown title]

Credits 
 Lorne Bregitzer – assistant engineer  
 Darrin Brunner – design, layout design  
 Ty Burhoe – tabla, turntables  
 Kevin Clock – engineer, assistant producer  
 E-Dub – vocals
 Michael R. Everett – artwork  
 Frenchy – paintings  
 Scott Gallery – artwork, design, layout design  
 Mary Louise Greenlaw – artwork  
 Kyle Hollingsworth – organ, synthesizer, piano, keyboards, piano (electric)  
 Jamie Janover – dulcimer (hammer)  
 Michael Kang – mandolin, violin, vocals, violin (electric), electronic mandolin  
 Mike Luba – trumpet  
 Jeroen Wery – trumpet
 Keith Moseley – bass guitar (electric), bass guitar (acoustic)  
 Bill Nershi – guitar (acoustic)  
 Todd Radunsky – photography  
 Jeremy Stein – photography  
 Michael Travis – percussion, drums  
 Keller Williams – guitar (acoustic), piano, arranger, bass guitar (electric), flugelhorn, guitar (electric), vocals, guitar (10 string), producer, bass guitar (acoustic), piano (grand)

References 

1999 albums
Keller Williams albums
The String Cheese Incident albums